Sundance Channel can refer to:

 Sundance TV, formerly known as Sundance Channel (United States).
 Sundance Channel (Canada)
 Sundance Channel (Netherlands)
 Sundance Channel (Europe)
 Sundance Channel (Iberia)
 Sundance Channel (Asia)
 Sundance Channel (Turkey)